Avondale is a borough in Chester County, in southeastern Pennsylvania, United States. The population was 1,272 at the 2020 census.

Demographics

As of the 2010 census, the borough was 30.7% non-Hispanic White, 8.9% Black or African American, 1.4% Native American, 0.8% Asian, and 2.8% were two or more races. 59.0% of the population were of Hispanic or Latino ancestry.

At the time of the 2000 census, there were 1,108 people, 345 households, and 247 families residing in Avondale. The population density was 2,248.7 per square mile (873.1/km2). There were 361 housing units at an average density of 732.7 per square mile (284.5/km2). The racial makeup of Avondale was 69.77% White, 16.61% African American, 0.90% Native American, 0.27% Asian, 10.38% from other races, and 2.08% from two or more races. Hispanic or Latino of any race accounted for 38.09% of the population.

Out of the 345 households, 36.5% had children under the age of 18 living with them, 49.6% were married couples living together, 12.8% had a female householder with no husband present, and 28.4% were non-families. 21.4% of all households were made up of individuals, and 6.7% had someone living alone who was 65 years of age or older. The average household size was 3.08 and the average family size was 3.52.

The population of Avondale was spread out, with 26.2% under the age of 18, 11.9% from 18 to 24, 32.7% from 25 to 44, 19.3% from 45 to 64, and 9.9% who were 65 years of age or older. The median age was 32 years. For every 100 females there were 113.1 males. For every 100 females age 18 and over, there were 122.3 males.

The median income for a household in Avondale was $46,875, and the median income for a family was $48,833. Males had a median income of $33,750 versus $25,536 for females. The per capita income was $16,794. About 9.7% of families and 14.9% of the population were below the poverty line, including 12.1% of those under age 18 and 15.3% of those age 65 or over.

Culture
Avondale is the location of St. Rocco Church, the first National Hispanic Parish established by the Roman Catholic Archdiocese of Philadelphia. The church was established in 2011 to serve the needs of the large Spanish-speaking Catholic Latino community in the area, which is mostly composed of Mexican immigrants, but also includes people from Puerto Rico, Colombia, Argentina, Guatemala, and other Latin American countries. Many parishioners work in the local mushroom farming industry.

Geography
Avondale is on the East Branch White Clay Creek.

Climate

Transportation

Pennsylvania Route 41 is the only numbered highway serving Avondale directly. It follows Pennsylvania Avenue on a northwest-to-southeast alignment through the heart of the borough.

Notable people
Famed journalist Mark Sullivan (1874–1952) was born on a farm just outside Avondale and returned to live on that same farm in his later years.

References

External links

Populated places established in 1894
Boroughs in Chester County, Pennsylvania
1894 establishments in Pennsylvania